Milebrook is a hamlet in Powys, Wales.

Location 

Milebrook is located on a crossroads of the A4113 road almost alongside the Afon Tefeidiad that, thereabouts, forms the border with England. The nearest town is Knighton a mile or so to its west.

External links 
Photos of Milebrook and surrounding area on geograph

Villages in Powys
Knighton, Powys